The Dog in the Sea, also known as The Dog and the Sailor is a northern European fairy tale classified as ATU 540, "The Dog in the Sea".

Description 
The common plot thread in all variants collected by German scholar Hans-Jörg Uther begins with an unhappy sailor trying to commit suicide by drowning, and meeting a talking dog that offers him help instead. The sailor and his supernatural companion sail together, and after three heavy storms the dog tells the sailor to jump into the water. Underwater the sailor finds a castle and a beautiful woman with magical powers. Warned by the dog, the sailor kills the woman and accomplishes three challenging tasks through three nights in the castle. Afterwards he cuts the dog's head off, and the dog is revealed to be a handsome prince, once enchanted by his mother-in-law/father/a witch, and now returned to human form.

Variants 
All of them have been collected from late 19th to 20th century. In his work,  claimed that type 540 existed in Russian language, but did not provide an example.

Kamp's version from Denmark, David Husmandssøn, is the longest and the most detailed of the above. It introduces the character of overprotective mother who wants her son to take up a "gentle trade", and the son purposefully makes mistakes in those apprenticeships until he is allowed to work at sea. Furthermore, the supernatural dog is stated to be a black poodle, a breed historically used as a water dog. The sailor at the end is offered "half the kingdom" by the prince's father, but rejects the offer and returns home to care for his parents.

In both Christensen and Kamp versions, not only the prince is released from the curse, but also his father, who has been turned into a lion and is held prisoner in chains in the castle, whose head and tail have to be cut off and attached vice versa again, or whose animal skin is to be cut open with a knife. In the Swedish version (Hackman), which, like the Finnish version, is only slightly related to the Danish version, the enchanted dog is not a human but a troll prince. In the Finnish version of Rausmaa, the dog disenchants itself by jumping into the water, while the second Finnish variant differs even more in its content.

Analysis 
This fairy tale type has been included in Enzyklopädie des Märchens. 

It has been analyzed from a queer theory perspective, with a protagonist that could be considered gay, asexual or otherwise queer.

In Popular Culture
An illustrated retelling of the story was published by Pete Jordi Wood.

See also 
 Ileana Simziana, another fairy tale interpreted as having a queer subtext

References 

Children's books with LGBT themes
ATU 500-559
Male characters in fairy tales
European fairy tales
Fictional sailors